Kondos Valley is a village in the Ghanche District of Gilgit-Baltistan. It shares boundaries with China on the northern side and India on the eastern side. It is 150 km from Skardu and 50 km from Khaplu with its population of approximately 5,500 people.

It is located 9,500 feet above sea level. Some parts of the Siachen Glacier are also situated at Kondus valley.

There are two rivers and a number of streams. Kondus Ghanche is very beautiful and there is a large number of mighty peaks. Before 1984 many mountaineers and expeditions used to visit Kondus. But after 1984 Pakistan Army founded their camps and it became prohibited for foreigners.

Kondus is situated northern side of Pakistan near the Siachen Glacier. It's considered as one of the last village of Pakistan near the Indian border. There are six villages Lachat, Thang, Jaffarabad, Choghogron, Karmanding, and Khorkondo respectively. People's occupations are farmers and mostly depend on agriculture. There are many waterfalls and springs especially hot-spring in Khorkondo. Due to this reason, Khorkondo is also known as a hot-spring. Water is enough for agricultural purposes. Two rivers are flowing through the village i.e River Khorkondo & River Kayver which meet at the center known as Lobaha mor. The road is not metalling however working is being carried in August 2021. The literacy rate is approximately 75%. The total population is above ten thousand.

 Populated places in Ghanche District